Paul Kutscher (born May 11, 1977 in Germany) is a male freestyle swimmer from Uruguay who swam for Uruguay at 2000 and 2004 Olympics. His brother Martín is also an Olympic swimmer, having swum for Uruguay at the 2004 and 2008 Olympics.

International Tournaments
2000 World Championships
2000 South American Championships
2000 Olympics
2003 Pan American Games
2004 Olympics
2007 World Championships
2008 South American Championships
2007 Pan American Games

External links

1977 births
Living people
Olympic swimmers of Uruguay
Uruguayan male freestyle swimmers
Swimmers at the 2000 Summer Olympics
Swimmers at the 2003 Pan American Games
Swimmers at the 2007 Pan American Games
Swimmers at the 2004 Summer Olympics
Pan American Games competitors for Uruguay
Uruguayan people of German descent